Hank Williams (1923–1953) was an American singer-songwriter and musician.

Hank Williams may also refer to:
Hank Williams Jr. (born 1949), American country singer-songwriter and musician, son of Hank Williams Sr.
Hank Williams III (born 1972), singer, drummer, bassist, and guitarist, son of Hank Williams Jr.
Hank Williams (basketball) (born 1952), American professional basketball player

See also
Hank Williams First Nation, a 2005 Canadian film
"Honk Williams", a bonus track (about the musician) from the album It Doesn't Matter Anymore